Courtney Elizabeth Whitmore, known as Stargirl (often called Stars or Star), is a superhero created by Geoff Johns and Lee Moder who appears in American comic books published by DC Comics. The character's name, appearance, and personality were patterned after Johns' 18-year-old sister Courtney, who died in the explosion of TWA Flight 800 in 1996.

Courtney Whitmore was originally known as the second Star-Spangled Kid, but she began using the name "Stargirl" after she was presented with the Cosmic Staff by Jack Knight.

Stargirl has appeared in Justice League Unlimited, Batman: The Brave and the Bold, Justice League Action, and Young Justice. She has also appeared in live-action shows Smallville played by Britt Irvin, Legends of Tomorrow played by Sarah Grey, and in her own television series played by Brec Bassinger. Bassinger will reprise the role in the fourth season of the HBO Max series Titans.

Publication history
The character was created by writer Geoff Johns and artist Lee Moder. She made her first appearance in Stars and S.T.R.I.P.E. #0 (July 1999). The character's inspiration was Geoff Johns' sister Courtney, who died in the explosion of TWA Flight 800 in 1996.

Fictional character biography

Stars and S.T.R.I.P.E.

Courtney Whitmore, stepdaughter of Pat Dugan, finds the original Star-Spangled Kid's gear in her stepfather's belongings. She dons the costume to annoy Dugan, as she resents his marrying her mother and moving the family from Los Angeles to Blue Valley, Nebraska. Dugan, a skilled mechanic, designs and builds S.T.R.I.P.E., a robotic suit that he uses to accompany and protect her.

During her time in Blue Valley, her frequent nemesis is the young villainess known as Shiv, daughter of the immortal Dragon King. Their most recent rematch was in Infinite Crisis, on a page added to the hardcover edition.

Stargirl
Courtney joins the Justice Society of America. After being given Starman Jack Knight's cosmic staff, she changes her identity to Stargirl. Courtney appears in most issues of JSA and it is in these pages that her half-sister Patricia Dugan is born.

Later, she confronts her predecessor's killer, Solomon Grundy. Driven further into madness by the Joker's chemical assault, Grundy attacks the JSA headquarters with the head of the Statue of Liberty. With the aid of Jakeem Thunder, Courtney fights Grundy in the streets and into the sewers below. The young heroes barely defeat Grundy and Johnny Thunderbolt repairs the Statue. Grundy later develops an obsession with Courtney.

Courtney encounters Merry Pemberton, the sister of the original Star-Spangled Kid, during the "Sins of Youth" storyline. Merry's concerns about her brother's legacy and about young superheroes battling adults causes friction with Courtney. They resolve their differences during a battle against the forces of Klarion the Witch Boy. Courtney later saves Merry's life during an attack by Amazo. During this incident, Courtney is magically aged to an adult by Klarion.

Later, she discovers her biological father Sam Kurtis working as a common thug for an incarnation of the Royal Flush Gang. They later confront each other during one of the Flush Gang's robberies.

In Stars and S.T.R.I.P.E. and an issue of Impulse, Courtney hints at having a crush on Robin (Tim Drake), a concept that was not developed in subsequent issues.

Courtney briefly dates fellow JSA member Captain Marvel, who, in his secret identity of Billy Batson, is the same age as she. To outsiders, however, Captain Marvel is by all appearances an adult, and the relationship between Marvel and Stargirl draws criticism from Jakeem Thunder and Jay Garrick. After Garrick confronts them, Marvel leaves the JSA and Courtney, instead of revealing his secret to the team. Marvel later returns to the JSA and explains that the Wisdom of Solomon prevents him from revealing his secret identity.

A glimpse into the future shows an adult "Starwoman" married to Albert Rothstein, the JSA member known as Atom Smasher.

JSA/JSA and Black Vengeance
Courtney's family is murdered by agents of Per Degaton and she travels with the rest of the JSA to 1951. The Modern Age successors to Golden Age JSA members meet and fight alongside the originals to save her family and the future. She finds herself forced to work with Atom Smasher again, for the first time since he defected to Black Adam's rival team. During her trip to the past, Courtney is briefly stuck in an asylum when she tries to recruit Ted Knight. Knight had become clinically depressed for his perceived role in the creation of the atomic bomb to the point that he initially thought Courtney was a hallucination, but she was saved by a figure later identified as Starwoman, an adult version of her infant sister Patricia. After the crisis is over, Courtney forgives Al for his past alliance with Black Adam but Atom Smasher is nearly killed by the Spectre during an attack on Khandaq. He survives, but the event reveals the depth of Courtney's feelings for him. She returns to her own time to find her family alive again.

Later, Atom Smasher is tried and convicted for his actions while working for Black Adam. During a TV appearance, Courtney says that with Al in prison, she would "be there for him... no matter how long it takes."

Infinite Crisis

Courtney is approached by the Shade, who tells her that her biological father is dead. This tragedy and her experience of the relationship between Liberty Belle and Jesse Quick prompts her to re-evaluate her family life. She discovers that she can't hate her biological father for his failings as a father and as a man. She also learns to accept Pat Dugan as her only real father figure.

Stargirl becomes part of a coalition consisting of the JSA, the Doom Patrol and the Teen Titans that is organized to stop Superboy-Prime from destroying Smallville. Superboy-Prime kills several of the Titans, including Pantha and Baby Wildebeest and maims Risk, removing his arm. Stargirl later attends a memorial service for heroes who died in the Crisis.

Afterwards, she begins attending college. She has altered her equipment: her rod now telescopes into a small cylinder, and her costume and belt materialize as the rod extends to full size.

"One Year Later"
Courtney joins the new roster of the Justice Society and fights without S.T.R.I.P.E.'s assistance.

A seasoned hero despite her age, she forges a bond with her young teammate Cyclone, the eager and over-impulsive granddaughter of the first Red Tornado. They two bond after witnessing the death of Mister America and Courtney suggests Cyclone create a new superhero costume and name. Stargirl resumes her role of mentorship for the youngest heroes by helping Jefferson Pierce's daughter, Jennifer, cope with her powers and her isolation. Courtney later expresses to Damage her doubts about Gog.

A future version of Courtney is seen in Teen Titans #53 along with Lex Luthor and his future Titans. Her role is minimal, however, she is seen wearing Jack Knight's goggles and jacket—the closest she has ever come to Jack's vision of "Starwoman" at the end of his series.

In the Final Crisis miniseries, Courtney joins with other heroes to form an underground resistance against Darkseid.

Courtney is present (and apparently involved in voting) for discussions on how to move the JSA forward after the Gog debacle (and whom to retain or remove from the team) and she defends some of the heroes who sided with Gog. Later she is present when the JSA meet a depowered Billy Batson, who reveals his secret identity to the others.

After the battle with Black Adam and Isis, Courtney was unhappy, as the events had happened on her birthday (and had ruined any planned celebrations). When she goes home and opens the door, the entire Justice Society is present and have prepared a late surprise party for her. Later she is unhappy to learn she still needed her braces despite being acknowledged as one of the senior members of the JSA. It has been established that both she and Atom Smasher love each other in direct quotes rather than asides and implied habits, but the elder JSA members' comments about their age difference forced Al to turn Courtney down, stating he loved her "like a sister".

Following a massive supervillain attack, the JSA is split in two. Power Girl convinces Courtney to join the JSA All-Stars splinter group. She later expresses a deep feeling of regret over siding with the All-Stars, claiming that she feels more at home with the original roster. Karen talks her through these doubts, telling her that she needed Courtney on the team because all the other teen members of the JSA look up to her.

The New 52
In September 2011, The New 52 rebooted DC's continuity. In this new timeline, Stargirl appears as part of a new Justice League of America title.

Born in Los Angeles, Courtney Whitmore was cleaning out the office of Barbara Whitmore's boyfriend Pat Dugan when she found a staff, a belt, and a shirt with a star on it. While trying them on, she became Stargirl and caught the perpetrator of a fire she spotted. The heroic actions went viral. After talking to her friend about what happens next, Courtney was informed by Pat that the person who originally wielded the equipment has died. Though Pat agreed to train her, Courtney had to respond to the criminal activity caused by Shadow Thief who was taking hostages to draw out a superhero. She managed to rout out Shadow Thief. When Stargirl returned home, she found that Shadow Thief arrived first, killed her brother, and wounded Barbara and Ted. Stargirl used this trauma to become a better superhero.

She was chosen by Amanda Waller as the public face of the JLA's PR campaign. After the disbandment of the JLA following the crossover event Forever Evil, Stargirl joined the Justice League United.

In the "Watchmen" sequel "Doomsday Clock", Stargirl is among the superheroes that confront Doctor Manhattan on the Moon. Stargirl appears with the Justice Society of America when Doctor Manhattan, undoes the changes that he made to the timeline that erased the Justice Society and the Legion of Super-Heroes.

In the pages of "The New Golden Age", Courtney accompanied Pat when they went to Myrtle Beach at the time when the Jill Carlyle version of Crimson Avenger got the Seven Soldiers of Victory back together. Courtney befriended Emiko Queen. While Courtney and Emiko were left behind because they were too young, they discover that the Seven Soldiers of Victory are going after Clock King. As Stargirl and Red Arrow, they discover that Clock King has used Per Degaton's time machine to bring the ship that the Lee Travis version of Crimson Avenger sacrificed himself on. Before destroying the time machine in order to send the ship back to its town time, Stargirl is told by Lee to find Wing. Emiko later visits Courtney telling her that she found a lead in where the missing children sidekicks are. Their search takes them to an island in the Diablo Triangle. When they arrived, they find that the sand is similar to Miraclo. When an egg-shaped Child Collector makes off with Red Arrow, Stargirl is saved by Air Wave, Cherry Bomb, Wing, and Robotman's creation Robbie the Robot Dog.

Powers and abilities
Courtney is an expert gymnast and kickboxer.

Equipment
When wearing the Cosmic Converter Belt, Stargirl has enhanced strength, speed, agility, and stamina as well as the ability to project shooting stars.

When wielding the Cosmic Staff, Stargirl can fly and perform cosmic energy manipulation.

Secret identity issues
Over the years, Courtney has been careless with her secret identity. Many of her school friends and some villains are aware of her identity; she admits this during the Identity Crisis crossover. Courtney revealed her identity to her friend Mary moments into her first outing, before she decided to make a career of being a costumed hero. In Justice Society of America #26, the entire JSA is at her home in full uniform, and are also present when she visits the dentist (in costume, much to Courtney's annoyance).

Supporting characters
Besides her stepfather Pat Dugan, the following are supporting characters of Stargirl:

 Barbara Whitmore - The mother of Courtney and the wife of Pat Dugan.
 Josh Hamman - A star athlete at Blue Valley High School who had a brief relationship with Courtney.
 Mary Kramer - A student at Blue Valley High School and a close friend of Courtney.
 Mike Dugan - The son of Pat Dugan who became Courtney's stepbrother and Barbara's stepson.
 Travis Thomas - The biggest bully at Blue Valley High School who has a crush on Mary.

Enemies
With her stepfather as S.T.R.I.P.E., Stargirl had her own set of enemies that she fought in the comics:

 British Bat - Douglas Hutton is a small-time supervillain. He managed to break Starman's leg before he was defeated by Stargirl, S.T.R.I.P.E., and the Justice Society of America.
 Dragon King - An immortal villain and war criminal who experimented on himself and has the appearance of a reptilian humanoid.
 Dr. Graft - A scientist who works for Dragon King.
 Icicle II - A cryokinetic supervillain.
 Johnny Sorrow - A silent movie actor who wears a mask because his face can kill anyone that looks at it.
 Laroonians - A race of aliens that invade Blue Valley.
 Nebula Man - A sentient universe.
 Paintball - Paul Deisinger is an art teacher who became a paint-themed criminal and minion of Dragon King.
 Principal Sherman - The principal of Blue Valley High School who works for Dragon King and is actually a robot.
 Sam Kurtis - Courtney's father, who works as the Two of Clubs in the Royal Flush Gang.
 Shadow Thief - A female supervillain who can turn into a shadow through her Colavarian Infiltration Suit.
 Shiv - The daughter of Dragon King with cybernetic enhancements and has expert gymnastic abilities.
 Skeeter - An insectoid minion of Dragon King.
 Solomon Grundy - A powerful zombie who later developed an obsession with her.
 Stunt - A minion of Dragon King.

In other media

Television

Live-action

 Courtney Whitmore as Stargirl appears in Smallville, portrayed by Britt Irvin. This version is a member of the Justice Society and was mentored by Sylvester Pemberton.
 Two variations of Courtney Whitmore / Stargirl appear in media set in the Arrowverse:
 The Stargirl of Earth-1 appears in season two of Legends of Tomorrow, portrayed by Sarah Grey. This version is a member of the Justice Society of America (JSA), who operated in 1942 before most of them went missing during a mission in 1956 and presumed dead. In reality, they dispersed themselves across the timeline to protect fragments of the Spear of Destiny, with Stargirl escaping to the sixth century and creating the court of Camelot under the alias of Merlin.
 The Stargirl of Earth-90 makes a cameo appearance in the Arrowverse crossover "Elseworlds" as one of several dead superheroes who failed a test brought about by the Monitor that devastated their world.
 A 13-episode, self-titled television series based on Courtney Whitmore as Stargirl was ordered by DC Universe for release in May 2020, with Brec Bassinger playing the title role, while Maizie Smith portrays a 5-year-old Courtney.
 Ahead of the series' premiere, Bassinger made a cameo appearance in the Arrowverse crossover "Crisis on Infinite Earths", which used archive footage from the Stargirl episode "The Justice Society".
 Courtney Whitmore as Stargirl will appear in an upcoming episode of Titans, portrayed again by Brec Bassinger.

Animation

 Courtney Whitmore as Stargirl appears in Justice League Unlimited, voiced by Giselle Loren. This version is a member of an expanded Justice League.
 Courtney Whitmore as Stargirl appears in the teaser segment of the Batman: The Brave and the Bold episode "Cry Freedom Fighters!", voiced by Hope Levy.
 Courtney Whitmore as Stargirl makes a cameo appearance in the Robot Chicken DC Comics Special as a member of the Justice League.
 Courtney Whitmore as Stargirl appears in Justice League Action, voiced by Natalie Lander.
 Courtney Whitmore appears in Young Justice, voiced by Whitney Moore. This version is the host of Goode World Studios' news show, Stargirl. As of a flashback depicted in the episode "Volatile", Whitmore has become Stargirl and joined the Outsiders.

Film
Courtney Whitmore as Stargirl was originally going to appear in Black Adam as a member of the Justice Society of America, but was cut from the film.

Video games
 Courtney Whitmore as Stargirl is a playable character in Lego Batman 3: Beyond Gotham, voiced by Tara Strong.
 Courtney Whitmore as Stargirl is a playable character in Infinite Crisis, voiced again by Natalie Lander.

References

Characters created by Geoff Johns
Comics characters introduced in 1999
DC Comics female superheroes
DC Comics martial artists
Fictional characters based on real people
Fictional characters from Los Angeles
Fictional characters from Nebraska
Fictional characters with energy-manipulation abilities
Fictional stick-fighters
United States-themed superheroes